Ḥaql or Ḥaqal is a city in the northwest of Saudi Arabia near the head of the Gulf of Aqaba, adjacent to Aqaba across the Jordanian border. The coasts of Egypt and Jordan can be seen from Haql.

Haql is a small city and it is not a port used for Red Sea shipping, and the relatively small Saudi population does not engage in water desalination. As a result, the reefs in this area are pristine and populated with diverse flora and fauna. The coasts of the Red Sea and Gulf of Aqaba in this region are scenic. There are views of the mountains of the Sinai Peninsula across the Gulf of Aqaba. Shipping is limited to traffic to and from the Port of Aqaba, Jordan. It has become one of the most attractive cities to visit for diving sports and accommodation. The two most attractive factors are its climate and geographical location. The Saudi Commission for Tourism and Antiquities (SCTA) has added more than 4 attractive spots on Haql.

Climate
Haql has a desert climate and most rainfall is in the winter. The Köppen-Geiger climate classification is BWh. About  of precipitation falls annually.

See also 
 Midian

References 

Populated coastal places in Saudi Arabia
Populated places in Tabuk Province
Underwater diving sites in Saudi Arabia
Red Sea